Gadzooks! is a British pop music television programme which aired on BBC2 from February to September 1965. It was originally produced by Barry Langford and was a replacement for his previous music show The Beat Room which had run in the same timeslot on BBC2 since July 1964.

The programme went through a number of name changes during its 35-episode run, originally being titled Gadzooks! It's All Happening, before changing to Gadzooks! It's The In-Crowd, then finally simply Gadzooks!.

The presenters of the programme included Alan David, Lulu, Roger Whittaker and future Crackerjack! presenter Christine Holmes. Recurring artistes who appeared most weeks included Liverpool singing trio The Three Bells, dance troupe The Beat Girls and blind singer & organist Peter Cook (not to be confused with the comedian of the same name), plus a number of special musical guests every week. Notable acts who performed on the programme included The Who, Tom Jones, Manfred Mann, Marianne Faithfull, The Animals, Chuck Berry, Sonny & Cher, The Byrds, The Four Tops and David Bowie (who appeared twice: both times under his real name of Davy Jones).

No recordings of this series are known to survive.

Episodes

References

External links
 

1965 British television series debuts
1965 British television series endings
1960s British music television series
Black-and-white British television shows
Pop music television series
English-language television shows
BBC Television shows
Lost BBC episodes